Ward Lake is a small lake, formed at the snout of the Ward Glacier, on the east side of the Royal Society Range in Victoria Land. Named by the Terra Nova Expedition (1910–13) after Ward Glacier.

References

Royal Society Range
Lakes of Victoria Land
Scott Coast